A Kinto was a trader or an unemployed person mostly occupied in entertaining others in georgian dukhans (restaurant), popular in Tbilisi in the 19th century and early 20th century.

The dance is light-natured and fun to watch.

Recent research suggests that homosexuality was common among the kinto community and tolerated by the mainstream society, who did not care about the lives of these marginalized peoples. Kinto thus became a symbol of the Tbilisi Pride movement.

References

Culture of Georgia (country)
Georgian words and phrases